Landfall is New Zealand's oldest extant literary magazine. The magazine is published biannually by Otago University Press. As of 2020, it consists of a paperback publication of about 200 pages. The website Landfall Review Online also publishes new literary reviews monthly. The magazine features new fiction and poetry, biographical and critical essays, cultural commentary, and reviews of books, art, film, drama, and dance. 

Landfall was founded and first edited by New Zealand poet Charles Brasch. It was described by Peter Simpson in the Oxford Companion to New Zealand Literature (2006) as "the most important and long-lasting journal in New Zealand's literature". Historian Michael King said that during the twentieth century, "Landfall would more than any other single organ promote New Zealand voices in literature and, at least for the duration of Brasch's editorship (1947–66), publish essays, fiction and poetry of the highest standard".

Background
Denis Glover, of Caxton Press, visited Brasch in London while on leave from naval service during World War II, and it was then the two "discussed the idea for a new, professionally produced literary journal in New Zealand". Other periodicals in existence at that time were smaller and irregularly published, such as Book, edited by Anton Vogt, and also published by Caxton Press. Brasch had held the ambition of publishing "a substantial literary journal" in New Zealand for at least 15 years.

The title Landfall was likely to have been inspired by Landfall in Unknown Seas, a poem written by Allen Curnow in 1942 and set to music by his friend Douglas Lilburn in 1944. The poem records the arrival of the first Europeans in New Zealand. It is one of the best-known of all New Zealand poems.

History

Brasch as editor: 1947–1966

The magazine was established in 1947 and published by Caxton Press, with Brasch as the editor-in-chief for the first two decades. Glover and Leo Bensemann acted as designers, typographers and printers. For its first 46 years (174 issues), Landfall was a quarterly of 76 pages (with some variation) with a brown paper cover, printed in two colours (and four colours from 1979 onwards). 800 copies of the first issue were printed, and Brasch later said they sold out "almost at once". An early review by Oliver Duff in the New Zealand Listener was positive but predicted that the magazine would last no more than a year. 

Landfall was New Zealand's leading literary journal during Brasch's editorship, and significantly important to New Zealand's emerging literary culture in the 1950s and 1960s. The journal also had pages dedicated to coverage of the arts in general and public affairs. Brasch devoted himself to editing the journal on a full-time basis, and applied high and exacting standards to the work published. At times, Brasch's high standards led to friction, with some young writers resenting what they saw as his inflexibility and solemnity, and calling the journal elitist. He did, however, encourage and promote the work of new writers in whom he saw promise.

Brasch ensured that the journal not only published poems, short stories and reviews, but also published paintings, photographs and other visual art, and provided commentary on the arts, theatre, music, architecture, and aspects of public affairs. His vision for the journal was that it would be "distinctly of New Zealand without being parochial", and he viewed the likely audience as the educated public: "Everyone for whom literature and the arts are a necessity of life." Virtually all prominent writers in New Zealand at that time were published in Landfall; Janet Frame wrote in her autobiography An Angel At My Table that her early impression of the magazine was that "if you didn't appear in Landfall then you could scarcely call yourself a writer". 

At the peak of the magazine's popularity, in the early 1960s, around 1600 copies were being printed of each issue. Brasch recalled that the peak sales figure was 2000 copies for an issue published in his last year of editing the paper, despite almost no advertising. In 1962, Brasch published Landfall Country: Work from Landfall, 1947–61, an anthology of works published in Landfall. Writers and poets featured included Maurice Gee, Frank Sargeson, C.K. Stead, Ruth Dallas, Curnow, James K. Baxter and Fleur Adcock, and there were reproductions of paintings, sculptures and photographs by various New Zealand artists including Colin McCahon, Evelyn Page and others. It also included twenty-nine pages of selections from the editorial section written by Brasch himself.

After Brasch: 1966–1992
Brasch left the magazine in 1966 and chose the young editor of magazine Mate, Robin Dudding, to succeed him. Dudding's noteworthy achievements were to commission artists to illustrate short stories, and to publish issue number 100, which included a lengthy interview with Brasch. In 1972, however, Dudding was dismissed by Caxton Press, reportedly for failing to deliver an issue on time. He set up a competing journal called Islands, and some of Landfall'''s key contributors such as Brasch, Curnow and Stead switched their allegiance to this new journal; Landfall did not recover its status as the leading literary journal of New Zealand until the editorship of David Dowling in the early 1980s. 

Bensemann, who had been involved on the production side since 1947, took over as editor for the fourteen issues from 1971 to 1975. Although he struggled to keep literary standards high in the absence of those key writers, he improved visual standards; the number of illustration pages increased from four pages to eight and featured a number of notable New Zealand artists such as Don Peebles and Pat Hanly. His successor, Peter Smart, was an English teacher who was keen to encourage beginner writers and to publish work that deserved encouragement, with mixed results. When Dowling succeeded Smart in 1982, he raised standards once again and recovered the magazine's literary reputation.

In issue 160, published in December 1986, the magazine announced that the magazine would be changing its editorial structure and moving to an editorial board of five editors with equal status, each responsible for a different section of the magazine. The issue's editorial explained that Landfall had to address different expectations of its readers and fast-pace developments. It was also hoped that the magazine would become more "outward looking" and include more works from the Pacific, Australia and other cultures having relevance to New Zealand. 

Otago University Press: 1992–present
In 1993, Otago University Press took over publication of the magazine, and Chris Price became sole editor from issue 175 onwards. From issue 185 onwards the publishing frequency decreased from quarterly to biannually. In 1999, the magazine was awarded Best Review Pages at the Montana New Zealand Book Awards. Since March 2011, the website Landfall Review Online'' has supplemented the printed magazine, with six to eight book reviews published on a monthly basis.

In 1997, to celebrate the magazine's 50th anniversary, the Landfall Essay Competition was held. In 2009 the competition was made an annual one and it is judged each year by the current editor. In 2017, the magazine launched the Charles Brasch Young Writers' Essay Competition, an annual essay competition open to writers aged 16 to 21.

Editors
 Charles Brasch (1947–1966, issues 1 to 80)
 Robin Dudding (1966–1972, issues 81 to 101)
 Leo Bensemann (1971–1975, issues 102 to 115)
 Peter Smart (1975–1981, issues 116 to 140)
 David Dowling (1982–1986, issues 140 to 159)
 Edited by a board with rotating members (1986–1992, issues 160 to 174)
 Chris Price (1993–2000, issue 175 to 200)
 Justin Paton (2000–2005, issues 200 to 209)
 Guest editors (2005–2010, issues 210 to 217)
 David Eggleton (2010–2017, issues 218 to 234)
 Emma Neale (2017–2021, issues 235 to 241)
 Lynley Edmeades (2021–present, issue 242 onwards)

See also
New Zealand literature
List of print media in New Zealand

References

External links

Landfall Review Online
Interview with Landfall editor David Eggleton for the Cultural Icons project.

1947 establishments in New Zealand
Biannual magazines
Magazines established in 1947
Mass media in Dunedin
Literary magazines published in New Zealand